Shozo Nishimura (born 26 September 1945) is a Japanese field hockey player. He competed in the men's tournament at the 1968 Summer Olympics.

References

External links
 

1945 births
Living people
Japanese male field hockey players
Olympic field hockey players of Japan
Field hockey players at the 1968 Summer Olympics
Sportspeople from Hokkaido
Asian Games medalists in field hockey
Asian Games bronze medalists for Japan
Medalists at the 1966 Asian Games
Field hockey players at the 1966 Asian Games
20th-century Japanese people